Bargarh Road railway station is a railway station near Bargarh city of Bargarh district, Odisha. It serves Bargarh city. Its code is BRGA. It has three platforms. Passenger, Express, and Superfast trains halt here.

Trains

The following trains halt at Bargarh Road railway station in both directions:

 Hatia–Yesvantpur Superfast Express
 Tatanagar–Yesvantpur Superfast Express
 Chennai Central–Asansol Ratna Express
 Hatia–Bangalore Cantonment Express
 Tatanagar–Yesvantpur Weekly Express
 Dhanbad–Alappuzha Express
 Tatanagar–Alappuzha Express
 Koraput–Rourkela Express
 Puri–Ahmedabad Weekly Express
 Gandhidham–Puri Weekly Superfast Express
 Puri–Surat Express
 Puri–Durg Express
 Lokmanya Tilak Terminus–Puri Superfast Express
 Puri–Sainagar Shirdi Express
 Puri–Ajmer Express
 Sambalpur–Rayagada Intercity Express
 Ispat Express
 Samaleshwari Express
 Nagavali Express
 Bhubaneswar–Bolangir Intercity Superfast Express

References

Railway stations in Bargarh district
Sambalpur railway division